The National Marching Band of the RAF Air Cadets is a military band made up of teenagers musicians of the Royal Air Force Air Cadets. It is considered to be a key musical ambassador for the RAFAC, with the band having given many notable performances at 10 Downing Street, Lincoln Cathedral, Twickenham Stadium, Whitehall and the International Air Tattoo.

RAFAC music camp
Music camps, which are sponsored by the RAFAC, are held annually at RAF College Cranwell and help train cadets in the RAFAC Music Service and, specifically, cadets in the national marching band.

Activities
 RAF anniversary parades
 St George's Day Parade
 Remembrance Day Parade
 Annual General Inspection (AGI) at Welbeck Defence Sixth Form College
 Charity events

Individual wing bands also perform in activities in their localities.

Instrumentation

The following is a list of standard instruments catered for by the RAFAC Band: 
 Saxophones
 Tubas
 Euphoniums
 Clarinets
 Bugles
 Cornets 
 Trumpets
 Trombones
 Basses
 Cymbals
 Side drum
 Bass drum

See also
 Royal Air Force
 Fort Blockhouse
 Royal Air Force March Past
 Royal Air Force Air Cadets
 Air Training Corps
 Activities of the Air Training Corps

References

External links

RAFAC official website

British military bands
Musical groups established in 2008
Youth organisations based in the United Kingdom
British ceremonial units
2008 establishments in England
British marching bands